Amado Angelo Rodriguez Lacuesta (a.k.a. Sarge Lacuesta) is a Filipino writer, and winner of several awards for his short stories, including the Philippine Graphic Award, the Palanca Memorial Award and the NVM Gonzalez Awards.

Career 

His first collection of short stories, Life Before X and Other Stories, published in 2000 by the [University of the Philippines Press], won the Madrigal-Gonzalez Best First Book Award and the Manila Critics' Circle National Book Award. His second collection, White Elephants: Stories, published in 2005 by Anvil Manila, also won the National Book Award. His third collection, Flames and Other Stories was published by Anvil in 2009.

As an editor, Lacuesta has edited the books Latitude: Writing from the Philippines and Scotland (Anvil Manila 2005) and  Fourteen Love Stories (University of the Philippines Press 2006). He is also the current literary editor of The Philippines Free Press.

Lacuesta is also the recipient of several local and international grants and writing fellowships, among them the UP National Writer's Workshop in Quezon City, Philippines (1992), the Silliman National Writers Workshop in Dumaguete, Philippines (1992), The Writer's Retreat at Hawthornden Castle in Lasswade, Scotland (2003) and The International Writing Program at the University of Iowa, Iowa City, Iowa, USA (2007).

References 

Living people
Year of birth missing (living people)
Filipino male short story writers
Filipino short story writers